Bio Paulin Pierre (born 15 April 1984 in Cameroon) is a former footballer who last played as a centre-back for Liga 2 club PSGC Ciamis, who is the current assistant coach of his former club Persipura Jayapura. Born in Cameroon, he represented the Indonesia national team.

In addition to being an important defender he often contributes with crucial goals for Persipura Jayapura.

International career
Bio was naturalised officially on 23 March 2015 as he lived and played in Indonesia for more than nine years. He was called up for first time to the Indonesia national football team by interim coach Benny Dollo for a friendly match against Myanmar on 30 March 2015.

Honours

Club
Persipura Jayapura
 Liga 1: 2008–09, 2010–11, 2013
 Indonesia Soccer Championship A: 2016
 Indonesian Community Shield: 2009
 Indonesian Inter Island Cup: 2011

Sriwijaya
 East Kalimantan Governor Cup: 2018

References

External links
 
 

1984 births
Living people
Indonesian footballers
Indonesia international footballers
Cameroonian footballers
Cameroonian emigrants to Indonesia
Indonesian people of Cameroonian descent
Cameroonian expatriate footballers
Cameroonian expatriate sportspeople in France
Cameroonian expatriate sportspeople in Indonesia
Expatriate footballers in France
Expatriate footballers in Indonesia
Naturalised citizens of Indonesia
Indonesian Super League-winning players
Liga 1 (Indonesia) players
RC Lens players
Union Douala players
Mitra Kukar players
Persipura Jayapura players
People from Centre Region (Cameroon)
Association football defenders